In the United States, scholarship tax credits, also called tax credit scholarships, education tax credits or  tuition tax credits, are a form of school choice that allows individuals or corporations to receive a tax credit from state taxes against donations made to non-profit organizations that grant private school scholarships. At the start of the 2014–2015 school year, fourteen states had scholarship tax credit programs.

History
The first scholarship tax credit program was Arizona's Personal Tax Credits for School Tuition Organizations program, which has been in operation since 1997. In 2001, Florida created the second Scholarship Tax Credit program by enacting the Florida Tax Credit Scholarship Program.

Legal challenges
On April 4, 2011, the Supreme Court of the United States upheld Arizona's Personal Tax Credits for School Tuition Organizations program in Arizona Christian School Tuition Organization v. Winn. The plaintiffs challenged that the use of tax credit scholarships to send children to religious schools violates the establishment clause. The district court originally dismissed the claim, but the Ninth Circuit court reversed the decision, ruling that the plaintiffs had standing to sue by citing Flast v. Cohen. The Supreme Court ruled 5-4 that the plaintiffs did not have standing to sue. Justice Kennedy, writing for the majority, explained that tax credits are not a form of government spending, and that donations to scholarship organizations are voluntary. As a result, no taxpayer is ever compelled to donate to such a program in violation of conscience and therefore no taxpayer can be harmed by the program. But plaintiffs must be able to demonstrate harm in order to have standing to sue, and so the case was dismissed for lack of standing and the scholarship program was upheld.

On March 12, 2009, Arizona's Corporate Tax Credits for School Tuition Organizations was upheld by the Arizona Court of Appeals in Green v. Garriott. The Arizona Supreme Court refused to hear the appeal.

State tax credit program comparison

As of September 2, 2014

Special needs scholarships

Children raised in the foster care system of various states are not provided the funding for school choice.  Recently many states have instituted voucher programs or scholarship programs allowing a foster family to choose a private school which is paid for with a scholarship or voucher. Special needs scholarships assist children in the foster care system as well as children with disabilities.

Other federal tax credits exist to help the special needs children including the adoption tax credit and the proposed Special Needs Tax Credit.

References

Tax credits
Taxation in the United States